LWL is a three-letter acronym which can mean:
Lifewide learning
Load Waterline Length
La wea loca